Aimé Millet  (September 28, 1819 – January 14, 1891) was a noted French sculptor, who was born and died in Paris.

Millet was the son of miniaturist Frédéric Millet (1796–1859) and uncle to Chicago architectural decorator Julian Louis Millet (1856–1923). He studied and made first in 1836 at the École des Beaux Arts with David d'Angers and Viollet-le-Duc, who was later to design the base of Millet's statue of Vercingetorix in Alesia.

In 1840 Millet began to produce his early works, in 1859 received the Légion d'honneur, and in February 1870 was appointed professor at the École des Arts décoratifs. He was a friend of sculptor Pierre Louis Rouillard and his students included Louis Majorelle, Berthe Morisot, John Walz, Henri-Camille Danger and François Pompon.

Millet died in Paris on January 14, 1891, and is buried in Montmartre Cemetery.

Selected works 

 The monumental statue of Vercingetorix, ordered by Napoleon III, built on site in Alesia.
 Apollo, Poetry, and Music, on Paris Opéra roof, between 1860–69
 François-René de Chateaubriand, bronze statue, Saint Malo, 1875
 Cassandre se met sous la protection de Pallas, Jardin des Tuileries, 1877
 South America, one of six cast iron allegories of the continents, built for the Exposition Universelle (1878), currently on the square of the Musée d'Orsay
 Phidias at the Jardin du Luxembourg, Paris, 1887

References 

 Mackay, James, The Dictionary of Sculptors in Bronze, Antique Collectors Club,  Woodbridge, Suffolk  1977.
 Insecula entry

External links
 

Artists from Paris
1819 births
1891 deaths
Burials at Montmartre Cemetery
French architectural sculptors
19th-century French sculptors
French male sculptors
19th-century French male artists